The Texas A&M University School of Dentistry, located in Dallas, Texas, United States, is the dental school of Texas A&M University and is a component of the Texas A&M Health Science Center.

The school provides the Doctor of Dental Surgery (D.D.S.), Master of Science (M.S.) and Bachelor of Science (B.S.) in Dental Hygiene degrees, and graduate training in 8 dental specialties and  had an enrollment of 594.

History
The School of Dentistry started in 1905 years as the State Dental College, a privately operated three-year school which had four graduates in its first class.

In 1918, the school's operations were taken over by Baylor University and the school was renamed Baylor University School of Dentistry.

The State of Texas took over operations in 1971, creating a non-profit corporation and renaming the school Baylor College of Dentistry.  In 1996, the College of Dentistry was placed under the auspices of the Texas A&M Health Science Center. In 1997, through its Center for TeleHealth, TAMBCD became the nation's first dental school to successfully demonstrate the use of telecommunications technology for dental medicine through a long-distance patient consultation between dentists at the BCD campus and 175 dental professionals convened in Orlando, Florida. On June 1, 2016 Texas A&M announced that as of August 1, 2016, the dental school would be officially renamed "Texas A&M College of Dentistry."

Academics
The Texas A&M School of Dentistry offers a four-year program leading to a doctor of dental surgery degree; a bachelor's degree in dental hygiene; several master's degree programs and a Ph.D. program in biomedical sciences; and post-doctoral degrees in the dental specialties. An M.D. program is offered in conjunction with Texas Tech University Health Sciences Center. The school also offers  Continuing Education for oral health clinicians.

Almost two-thirds of all the dentists in the Dallas–Fort Worth metroplex received their education at the School of Dentistry, and more than one-third of all dentists in Texas are graduates of the school; more than 9000 dentists and hygienists have graduated from the school. It is the largest single provider of oral health care services in the Metroplex. Each year, the school completes more than 103,500 patient care visits, 45 percent of which benefit low-income individuals. Of the care it provides, the school donates $3.3 million in services to the community. The school produces the nation's only syndicated, weekly dental health news program, Dental Health Check.

See also

American Student Dental Association

References

External links
Texas A&M School of Dentistry Website

Dentistry
Universities and colleges in Dallas
Educational institutions established in 1905
Dental schools in Texas
1905 establishments in Texas